Arve Arvesen (born 12 September 1869, died 16 January 1951) was a Norwegian violinist from Hamar, in his time, considered the best in the country. He studied under Gudbrand Bøhn, as well as in Leipzig, Marsick in Paris and Eugene Ysaye in Brussels.

After this he was concert master in Helsingfors (1894–96), and with the Bergen Filharmoniske Orkester (1900–03). He also founded the Oslo Kammermusikkforening in 1915 and Arvesens kammertrio in 1921. He was also a teacher, and from 1928, worked with the Bergen Conservatoire.  He was the father of Olaus Arvesen.

References 

Norwegian classical violinists
20th-century Norwegian violinists
Norwegian expatriates in Finland
Musicians from Hamar
1869 births
1951 deaths